Top Hu  is a tambon (subdistrict) located in the southern region of Det Udom District, in Ubon Ratchathani Province, Thailand. In 2021, it had a population of 12,340 people. Neighbouring subdistricts are (clockwise from the south) Yang, Kaeng, Non Sombun, Tha Pho Si, Klang, Phon Sawan, and Non Sawan.

History
The tambon was named after the village in the area; however, such a village was later spilt off to create a new subdistrict, Phon Sawan, which is currently a tambon in Na Chaluai district and was further divided to establish a new administrative division, Non Sawan, where the Top Hu village is currently located. Previously, the tambon was administered by its subdistrict council (สภาตำบล), but the council was later upgraded to the Subdistrict Administrative Organization of Top Hu on February 23, 1997.

In 1972, together with six villages split from Na Chaluai, three of the villages in Top Hu were broke off to form a new subdistrict, Phon Sawan, which currently is a tambon in Na Chaluai district.

Geography
The tambon is located in the southern region of the Det Udom district, on the low river plain of the Lam Dom Yai River.

Administration
The Top Hu subdistrict is divided into 17 administrative villages (mubans; หมู่บ้าน), five of which, Kham Samran, Non Khaen, Pho Sai, Phon Duan, and Song Khon villages, each was further divided into two community groups (Mu; หมู่). The entire area is governed by the Subdistrict Administrative Organization of Top Hu (องค์การบริหารส่วนตำบลตบหู; Top Hu SAO).

As of the 2021 census, it had a population of 12,340 people with 5,467 households. The following is a list of the subdistrict's mubans, which roughly correspond to the villages.

References

Tambon of Ubon Ratchathani Province